Patrick Rhys Brown (born 23 August 1998) is an English cricketer who plays for Worcestershire. He made his international debut for England in November 2019.

Domestic, T20 and franchise career
Brown made his Twenty20 cricket debut for Worcestershire in the 2017 NatWest t20 Blast on 26 July 2017. He made his first-class debut for Worcestershire in the 2017 County Championship on 6 August 2017. He made his List A debut for Worcestershire in the 2018 Royal London One-Day Cup on 23 May 2018.

Brown took 4–21 against Lancashire County Cricket Club which meant the Worcestershire Rapids reached the final of the Vitality t20 Blast on 15 September 2018 and took on the Sussex Sharks . Worcestershire  went on to beat the Sharks by 4 wickets in the final to secure their maiden T20 Blast Trophy.

In October 2018, he was named in the squad for the Sylhet Sixers team, following the draft for the 2018–19 Bangladesh Premier League.

In November 2019, Brown signed with Melbourne Stars for the 2019–20 Big Bash League season replacing Dale Steyn who had gone back to South Africa due to international commitments.

International career
In September 2019, Brown was named in England's Twenty20 International (T20I) squad for their series against New Zealand. He made his T20I debut for England, against New Zealand, on 1 November 2019. The following month, Brown was named in England's One Day International (ODI) squad for their series against South Africa. However, in January 2020, Brown was ruled out of England's ODI and T20I squads, following a stress fracture to his lower back.

On 29 May 2020, Brown was named in a 55-man group of players to begin training ahead of international fixtures starting in England following the COVID-19 pandemic.

References

External links
 

1998 births
Living people
English cricketers
England Twenty20 International cricketers
Worcestershire cricketers
Sportspeople from Peterborough
Sylhet Strikers cricketers
Birmingham Phoenix cricketers
Lincolnshire cricketers
Oval Invincibles cricketers